Heilbron is a variation of the Jewish surname Heilprin and may refer to:
 Brently Heilbron, (born 1976), American satirist 
 Ian Heilbron  (1886–1959), British chemist
 John L. Heilbron (born 1934), American historian of science
 Lorna Heilbron (born 1948), Scottish actress
 Rose Heilbron (1914–2005), British barrister and judge
 Vivien Heilbron (born 1944), Scottish actress

See also
 Heilbronn (disambiguation)

Jewish surnames
Yiddish-language surnames